Medina is a city in Hennepin County, Minnesota, United States. An outer edge suburb of Minneapolis–Saint Paul, the city has a primarily rural character, with agricultural lands and natural preservation areas. Medina is home to the corporate headquarters of Polaris Inc., an automotive manufacturer that produces items such as all-terrain vehicles and snowmobiles.

The population was 6,837 at the 2020 census.

History
Originally named Hamburg Township, it was soon after, on May 11, 1858, renamed after the city of Medina, Saudi Arabia, which had been in the news that year. The township of Medina extended as far south as Lake Minnetonka until Orono Township was formed in 1889. On 26 May, 1955, Medina Township was incorporated as a village. It became a city in 1974 when Minnesota changed its statutes.

For almost all of Medina's history, it has been rural community with a large farming presence. However, beginning in the 1970s, Medina has started becoming more urbanized with paved roads, street signs, and some suburban developments.

Geography
Minnesota State Highway 55 serves as the main route. Other routes include County Roads 19 and 24. The city of Loretto is completely enclaved by the city of Medina; Loretto is located in the northwestern corner of Medina.

Demographics

2010 census
As of the census of 2010, there were 4,892 people, 1,702 households, and 1,386 families living in the city. The racial makeup of the city was 94.0% White, 1.0% African American, 0.1% Native American, 3.2% Asian, 0.4% from other races, and 1.3% from two or more races. Hispanic or Latino of any race were 1.2% of the population.

There were 1,702 households, of which 42.0% had children under the age of 18 living with them, 74.4% were married couples living together, 4.8% had a female householder with no husband present, 2.3% had a male householder with no wife present, and 18.6% were non-families. 15.6% of all households were made up of individuals, and 7.3% had someone living alone who was 65 years of age or older. The average household size was 2.87 and the average family size was 3.23.

The median age in the city was 43.3 years. 30.7% of residents were under the age of 18; 4.7% were between the ages of 18 and 24; 18% were from 25 to 44; 34.4% were from 45 to 64; and 12.2% were 65 years of age or older. The gender makeup of the city was 49.8% male and 50.2% female.

2000 census
As of the census of 2000, there were 4,005 people, 1,309 households, and 1,117 families living in the city. The racial makeup of the city was 97.33% White, 0.47% African American, 0.22% Native American, 1.20% Asian, 0.02% Pacific Islander, 0.17% from other races, and 0.57% from two or more races. Hispanic or Latino of any race were 0.82% of the population.

There were 1,309 households, out of which 47.0% had children under the age of 18 living with them, 78.4% were married couples living together, 4.3% had a female householder with no husband present, and 14.6% were non-families. 11.2% of all households were made up of individuals, and 2.8% had someone living alone who was 65 years of age or older. The average household size was 3.05 and the average family size was 3.31.

In the city, the population was spread out, with 32.2% under the age of 18, 5.0% from 18 to 24, 28.5% from 25 to 44, 27.3% from 45 to 64, and 6.9% who were 65 years of age or older. The median age was 38 years. For every 100 females, there were 99.7 males. For every 100 females age 18 and over, there were 103.6 males.

The median income for a household in the city was $88,847, and the median income for a family was $96,909. Males had a median income of $65,938 versus $32,460 for females. The per capita income for the city was $49,127. About 0.4% of families and 1.3% of the population were below the poverty line, including 1.5% of those under age 18 and none of those age 65 or over.

Government

Education
Medina is covered by four school districts:
  Orono
  Delano
  Rockford
  Wayzata

Notable people
 Brian Burke – former National Hockey League general manager and executive
 Caden Clark – professional soccer player for RB Leipzig
 Steve Hutchinson – retired, all-pro guard for the Minnesota Vikings
 Corey Koskie – retired, former Major League Baseball third baseman
 Greg LeMond – former Cycling World Champion and three-time Tour de France winning bicycle racer.  LeMond is the only American to ever win the Tour de France.
 John Randle – retired, Hall of Fame NFL player
 Flip Saunders – former NBA basketball head coach, and former President of Basketball Operations
 Ryan Saunders - NBA head coach for the Minnesota Timberwolves
 Carlos Silva – professional Major League Baseball pitcher
 Karen Philipp - American singer and actress
Karl-Anthony Towns - Player for the Minnesota Timberwolves

See also
 Hamel, Minnesota
 Hennepin County

References

External links
 City website

Cities in Minnesota
Cities in Hennepin County, Minnesota